Schubert Jorge Pérez Denis (born March 29, 1954 in Montevideo), known for his sakename Jorge Traverso, is a Uruguayan journalist and newsanchor.

References

External links
 Website 

Uruguayan television journalists
People from Montevideo
1954 births
Living people
Uruguayan radio journalists
Uruguayan radio presenters